A civil emergency message (SAME code: CEM) is a warning issued through the Emergency Alert System (EAS) in the United States to warn the public of a significant in-progress or imminent threat or danger to public safety. It is typically issued by a local or state authority and is relayed by the National Weather Service. The warning is a higher priority than a local area emergency (LAE), but it's less specific than a civil danger warning (CDW). For example, the warning could be used to describe an alert issued by the National Terrorism Advisory System.

Examples

A mandatory evacuation of portions of McDowell County, North Carolina issued after a landslide, caused by the effects of Subtropical Storm Alberto, threatened the integrity of a dam in the county:

 NCC111-301200-
 
 BULLETIN - EAS ACTIVATION REQUESTED
 CIVIL EMERGENCY MESSAGE
 NORTH CAROLINA EMERGENCY MANAGEMENT AGENCY
 RELAYED BY NATIONAL WEATHER SERVICE GREENVILLE-SPARTANBURG SC
 322 AM EDT WED MAY 30 2018
 
 THE FOLLOWING MESSAGE IS TRANSMITTED AT THE REQUEST OF MCDOWELL
 COUNTY EMERGENCY MANAGEMENT AND THE NORTH CAROLINA EMERGENCY
 MANAGEMENT AGENCY. 
 
 MANDATORY EVACUATION FOR ALL RESIDENTS LIVING BELOW LAKE TAHOMA
 CONTINUES. THIS WAS ISSUED AT THE RECOMMENDATION OF DAM ENGINEERS
 WHO REMAIN ON THE SCENE. THE CLASS 1 EMERGENCY AT LAKE TAHOMA
 WILL CONTINUE UNTIL DAM INSPECTORS EVALUATE THE DAM DURING
 DAYLIGHT HOURS. THIS IS FOR YOUR SAFETY.
 
 ALL RESIDENTS LIVING BELOW LAKE TAHOMA SHOULD EVACUATE NOW. 
 
 THIS INCLUDES: 
 
 LAKE TAHOMA ROAD FROM LAKE TAHOMA SOUTH TO US 70 WEST.
 TOMS CREEK ROAD FROM NC 80 TO MORGAN LAKE ROAD.
 TOM JOHNSON CAMPING CENTER.
 OLD GREENLEE RD FROM CRANE RESISTOFLEX ROAD TO WATER FILTER PLANT.
 US 70 WEST FROM PLEASANT GARDENS FIRE DEPARTMENT TO NORTH MAIN
 STREET.
 ALL RESIDENCES ALONG THE CATAWBA RIVER FROM TOM JOHNSON TO
 LAKE JAMES.
 THIS INCLUDES DEVELOPMENTS THAT BORDER THE CATAWBA RIVER IN THE
 HANKINS COMMUNITY.
 RIVERVIEW ACRES OFF HANKINS ROAD.
 KATYDID DRIVE.
 LENTZ ROAD.
 RIVERBEND ACRES OFF HANKINS ROAD.
 CROSS CREEK DRIVE FROM INTERSECTION OF HANKINS ROAD TO THE 300 BLOCK.
 ALL LOCATIONS ALONG US 221 BUSINESS.
 GARDEN CREEK ROAD.
 NORTH MAIN STREET FROM FLICK VIDEO TO US 70 W INTERSECTION.
 BURNETTES LANDING.
 LAKE JAMES LANDING. 
 
 SHELTERS ARE OPEN AT THE FOLLOWING LOCATIONS:
 
 YMCA OF MARION (NEAR MCDOWELL HOSPITAL)
 GLENWOOD BAPTIST CHURCH
 OLD FORT BAPTIST CHURCH
 
 REPEATING, A MANDATORY EVACUATION FOR ALL RESIDENTS LIVING BELOW
 LAKE TAHOMA CONTINUES. THIS IS FOR YOUR SAFETY. ALL RESIDENTS LIVING
 BELOW LAKE TAHOMA SHOULD EVACUATE NOW. 
 
 $$

References 

 Definitions of Colors on the National Weather Service Brownsville/Rio Grande Valley Website Map
 NWS Lubbock, TX Non-weather Emergency Messages Page

National Weather Service
Warning systems